The Navistar VT engine family is a line of diesel engines that was produced by International Truck and Engine (Navistar International) from 2003 to 2016.  Developed as the replacement for the T444E V8, the VT V6 and V8 diesels were the smallest diesel engines used in Navistar vehicles, slotted below the DT inline-6 engine family.  Sharing many applications with the DT466 inline-6, the VT engines were used in medium-duty trucks and school bus chassis, competing against the Cummins B-series and the Mercedes-Benz MBE900 diesel engines.  In 2007, both the VT and DT engines were rebranded under the MaxxForce brand name, with model designations related to their displacement.   

From 2003 to 2010, VT engines were used by Ford Motor Company in several vehicles, sold as the second and third generations of the Ford Power Stroke diesel engine family. Fords E series continued to use the VT365 until the end of 2012.  For 2011 production, the Power Stroke diesel shifted to a Ford-produced design.  

After 2016, Navistar ended production of both VT and DT-derived MaxxForce diesel engines, making the VT the final V-configuration engine produced by International.  In medium-duty vehicles, the Cummins ISB6.7 diesel served as its replacement.

Variants

VT365

The VT365 is used in many International schoolbuses and is also known as the 6.0 L PowerStroke in 2003-2007 model year Ford Super Duty trucks and 2003-2010 model year Ford E-Series vans/chassis cabs, is a 32-valve pushrod V8. It also uses a 2nd generation (G-2) HEUI (Hydraulic-Electronic Unit injector) direct injection fuel system, as well as a variable-geometry turbocharger, which is designed to reduce turbo lag and create better throttle response.

An optional TorqShift 5-speed automatic transmission is available for Ford trucks. This special transmission gives improved performance to the engine, featuring a tow/haul mode (for example).

VT275

A variant of the VT365 is the VT275 4.5 L V-6, which is basically a 6.0 L V-8 less two cylinders. However, it uses a sequential twin-turbocharger system, instead of the single variable-geometry turbocharger used in the VT365. It is used in the 2006 Ford LCF (Low Cab Forward) and International CF (Cab Forward) (later CityStar) series trucks.

For the 2007 model year, the VT275 was brought up to 2007 EPA emission standards and renamed the MaxxForce 5.

It has since been discontinued for the 2010 model year.

MaxxForce 7
The MaxxForce 7, the International/Navistar engine which is a 6.4L V8 engine or also known as the 6.4 L PowerStroke in 2008-2010 model year Ford Super Duty trucks, is a V8 turbo-diesel engine. The engine has a Series Sequential Turbocharger. They are not twin turbos, there is a high pressure and low pressure turbo, with only the high pressure turbo being a VGT (variable geometry turbo). The engine also uses a high pressure common rail fuel injection system.

This engine is also used in International trucks and buses. However, the EPA2007 MaxxForce 7 has not the compound turbocharger system; rather, it uses a single stage variable vane turbocharger. Displacement and injector systems are the same as the Ford branded Power Stroke.

The cylinder block has also been updated using compacted graphite iron (CGI) material to increase strength and reduce weight.

Applications
Ford E-Series (2003-2010)
Ford Excursion (2003-2005)
Ford Super Duty (2003-2010)
International 3000 (rear-engine bus)
International Citystar/Ford LCF
 International Durastar/4200
International 3300 (cowled bus)
 International MXT
 International MXT-MV
International Terrastar

References

Notes

See also
 Ford Power Stroke engine
 List of Ford engines
 List of Navistar engines

VT365
V8 engines
Diesel engines by model